Aesop was an ancient Greek storyteller known for his fables.

Aesop, AESOP, or Aesopus may also refer to:

 Aesop (brand), an Australian luxury skincare brand
 Aesop (record label), a British independent record label
 Aesopus (gastropod), a genus of marine gastropods
 Aesopus (historian), a Greek historian who wrote a life of Alexander the Great
 Association of European Schools of Planning, abbreviated AESOP
 Aesop, a pseudonym of mathematician Jim Propp
 Aesop Rock, an American Hiphop recording artist

See also

Aesop's Fables (disambiguation)
 Clodius Aesopus, a Roman tragedian